Ian Richards (born 5 October 1979) is an English former footballer. He began his career with Blackburn Rovers but failed to make the first team and moved on to Halifax Town, where he made 24 Football League appearances. He has since gone on to play for non-league teams Belper Town and Stocksbridge Park Steels. He first managed Penistone Church before moving on to take the manager's job at Stocksbridge Park Steels in September 2021. He is now Vice Principal at Penistone Grammar School.

References

1979 births
Living people
English footballers
Footballers from Barnsley
Blackburn Rovers F.C. players
Stocksbridge Park Steels F.C. players
Association football midfielders